The Memorial Gate for Virtuous Women, also known as Bound by Chastity Rules, (열녀문 – Yeolnyeomun) is a 1962 South Korean film directed by Shin Sang-ok. It was chosen as Best Film at the Grand Bell Awards. It was also entered into the 13th Berlin International and Cannes Film Festivals.

Plot
A melodrama based on a novel. A widow in an aristocratic family has an affair with a servant and bears him a son. The widow's in-laws drive the servant and his son away. As a man, the widow's son comes to visit her, but, bound by the custom that she must remain celibate after her husband's death, she cannot acknowledge him.

Cast
Choi Eun-hee
Shin Young-kyun
Kim Dong-won
Han Eun-jin

Bibliography

References

External links

 

 

1962 films
Films directed by Shin Sang-ok
Best Picture Grand Bell Award winners
1960s Korean-language films
South Korean drama films
1962 drama films